Germantown station is a SEPTA Regional Rail component in Philadelphia, Pennsylvania. Located at Chelten Avenue and Baynton Street in the Germantown neighborhood, it serves the Chestnut Hill East Line.

The station is in zone 1 on the Chestnut Hill East Line, on former Reading Railroad tracks, and is 6.8 track miles from Suburban Station.

History
The Germantown railway station has existed since at least 1884 when it could be found in the same place it is today on the Chestnut Hill East line. It was on SEPTA's R7 line until the regional-rail renaming.

On May 28, 2009, SEPTA approved a $1.9 million rehabilitation effort which included the Germantown station.

In 2013, this station saw 102 boardings and 140 alightings on an average weekday.

Station layout

Gallery

References

External links

SEPTA – Germantown Station
 Station from Google Maps Street View

SEPTA Regional Rail stations
Germantown, Philadelphia
Railway stations in the United States opened in 1885
1885 establishments in Pennsylvania